Vâlcelele may refer to several places in Romania:

 Vâlcelele, Buzău, a commune in Buzău County
 Vâlcelele, Călărași, a commune in Călărași County
 Vâlcelele, a village in Merișani Commune, Argeș County
 Vâlcelele, a village in Suplacu de Barcău Commune, Bihor County
 Vâlcelele, a village in Brăeşti Commune, Botoșani County
 Vâlcelele, a village in Bobâlna Commune, Cluj County
 Vâlcelele, a village in Vânătorii Mici Commune, Giurgiu County
 Vâlcelele, a village in Vlădeni Commune, Iași County
 Vâlcelele, a village in Colceag Commune, Prahova County
 Vâlcelele, a village in Stroiești Commune, Suceava County
 Vâlcelele, a village in Corbița Commune, Vrancea County